Johannes von Trapp (born 17 January 1939) is an Austrian American singer and former member of the Trapp Family Singers, whose lives were the inspiration for the musical and movie The Sound of Music. He is the tenth and youngest child. As of December 2022, Johannes is the last surviving sibling of the von Trapp family.

Biography
Johannes von Trapp was born in 1939 in Philadelphia while the family was on a concert tour. 
He was eight years old when his father Georg von Trapp died in 1947. His siblings are Rosmarie (1929-2022) and Eleonore (1931-2021). He graduated from prep school at the Canterbury School in Connecticut in 1956. Later that year, he, along with several other members of the extended family, went to New Guinea to do missionary work. He later joined the Vermont Army National Guard as a Second Lieutenant. He attended training as a medical officer at Fort Sam Houston, Texas in 1967.

By 1969, he had graduated from Dartmouth College. He attended the Yale University's School of Forestry for his Master's degree. He returned to Stowe, Vermont, to help with the family inn's finances, and then became the manager of the resort. In 1977, he moved to British Columbia and later to a ranch in Montana. He eventually returned to manage the family business in Vermont.

In 1969 von Trapp married Lynne Peterson. They have two children. Johannes visited the Trapp Villa in Salzburg Aigen on 28 July 2008, with his half-sister Maria Franziska, and Erika, the widow of his half-brother Werner.

References

External links
 

1939 births
Living people
Johannes
American people of Austrian descent
20th-century Austrian women opera singers
20th-century American male singers
20th-century American singers
Canterbury School (Connecticut) alumni
Musicians from Philadelphia
Dartmouth College alumni
Yale University alumni
People from Stowe, Vermont
Singers from Pennsylvania